Skyroot Aerospace Private Limited is an Indian private aerospace manufacturer and commercial launch service provider headquartered in Hyderabad. The company was founded by former engineers and scientists from ISRO. It aims to develop and launch its own series of small lift launch vehicles especially crafted for the small satellite market. Sky root is the first Indian rocket launching private company

History

Skyroot Aerospace was formed in July 2018 by former Indian Space Research Organisation scientists Pawan Kumar Chandana, Naga Bharath Daka through the support of Vasudevan Gnanagandhi as well as a small group of entrepreneurs including CureFit founders Mukesh Bansal and Ankit Nagor. Skyroot has initially raised  million, including from space and defence contractor Solar Industries.
The company has been developing its first launch vehicle, the "Vikram 1," which is on track for its initial launch around the end of 2022. 

On 6 October 2020, the National Startup Awards 2020 were declared by the Union minister of commerce and industry Piyush Goyal, where Skyroot Aerospace has emerged as the winner. The National Startup Awards are given in recognition of startups across several categories that offer novel solutions for complex problems in the country, and creating businesses that are scalable and sustainable.

On 20 November 2020, Skyroot Aerospace entered into a memorandum of understanding with Dhruva Space, an Indian private satellite manufacturer.

On 2 February 2021, Indian Space Research Organisation (ISRO) and Skyroot Aerospace signed a non-disclosure agreement (NDA). The NDA will allow Skyroot Aerospace to access the facilities and technical expertise in ISRO centers to develop their launch vehicles.

On 8 February 2021, Skyroot Aerospace Announced that they partnered with Bellatrix Aerospace to use the Orbital Transfer Vehicle of Bellatrix Aerospace with their Vikram series of Launch Vehicles.

In March 2021, Skyroot Aerospace team won the Aegis Graham Bell Award for Jury choice award under innovation category for the year 2020.

On 20 May 2021, Skyroot Aerospace has raised $11 million in Series A funding round led by promoters of renewable energy firm Greenko Group (Anil Chalamalasetty and Mahesh Kolli), with participation of investors including Solar Industries and former WhatsApp Chief Business Office (CBO) Neeraj Arora, Mukesh Bansal founder of Myntra & Curefit, Worldquant Ventures, Graph Ventures, Sutton Capital, Vedanshu Investments and few other angels. Skyroot Aerospace will be deploying these funds to grow its team and complete the full development and testing of all subsystems of Vikram 1 launch vehicle.

Skyroot has already started bookings for launches starting end 2022 and are actively engaging global customers

The Department of Space has signed its first-ever agreement with Skyroot Aerospace for providing it access to ISRO's facilities and expertise towards testing of sub-systems and systems of launch vehicles. Skyroot Aerospace has, therefore, become the first Indian startup to formally enter into an agreement with ISRO for using its assets since the announcement of the new policy decision of the Government of India in May 2020, when finance minister opened up the space sector and ISRO facilities for private players. Finally on 11 September 2021, ISRO’s scientific secretary and chairman of interim IN-SPACe (Indian National Space Promotion and Authorisation Centre) committee R Umamaheswaran, who represented Department of Space, Skyroot Aerospace CEO Pawan Kumar Chandana and COO Naga Bharath Daka signed this framework MoU.

On 22 September 2021, the list of "The 2021 LinkedIn Top Startups" was revealed with 25 young, emerging companies where India wants to work. Skyroot Aerospace was ranked 7th on this LinkedIn's 2021 Top Startups List in India.

On 27 January 2022, Skyroot Aerospace raised of $4.5 million in a bridge round to Series B funding led by Google's founding board member Ram Shriram's Sherpalo Ventures. The bridge round also witnessed participation by Wami Capital, existing investors – former Whatsapp chief business officer Neeraj Arora and ex-Google executive Amit Singhal. Skyroot plans to use the fund to build the infrastructure required to launch space vehicles. This round aids Skyroot to build critical infrastructure early on and helps accelerate towards their launch of Vikram 1 in 2022. This fresh investment round brings the total capital raised by the startup to around $17 million, which is the largest by an Indian Space start-up yet.

On 10 May 2022, Skyroot Aerospace announced their new identity reflecting their ambition to reach the stars with a goal of ‘Opening Space for all’. Their logo subtly crystallizes the acronym ‘SR’ of SKYROOT into a rocket-plane, while the sharp elegant edges represent their cutting-edge tech.

On the 11th May 2022, Skyroot Aerospace was recognized with yet another National Award, the National Technology day 2022. The Technology Startup Award was won by Skyroot Aerospace for Cryogenic, Liquid and Solid Propulsion Technologies catering to the needs of small satellite launch vehicle market. Dr. Jitendra Singh, Union Minister of State, Science and Technology Minister, has given this prestigious award.

On 18 November 2022 Skyroot Aerospace performed the maiden launch of its Vikram-S suborbital rocket, becoming the first Indian private company to reach outer space (apogee was 89.5 km).

Earth-Storable Rocket Engine

Raman-1 
In August 2020, Skyroot first came into the limelight when it test-fired the Raman-I (named after C. V. Raman) hypergolic-fuel upper stage engine. This liquid-fuel upper stage is a component of Vikram-I and Skyroot was the first Indian private entity to test such an engine.

Solid Rocket Motor

Kalam-5 
On 22 December 2020, Skyroot tested the solid-fuel rocket engine Kalam-5 (named after A. P. J. Abdul Kalam), the first of five planned carbon-composite Kalam rocket motors which are expected to power its launch vehicles. The test happened in Nagpur at a private test facility owned by Solar Industries, which is also an investor in Skyroot. In the name "Kalam-5", the 5 refers to the peak sea level thrust of 5.3 kN. The final engine in the series will be four times the size of Kalam-5.

Kalam-100 
 
Skyroot Aerospace, on 19 May 2022, has announced the successful completion of a full duration test-firing of its ‘Vikram-1’ rocket stage, representing a major milestone for the company. Named ‘Kalam-100’ after former president and the renowned Indian rocket scientist A.P.J. Abdul Kalam, the third stage of ‘Vikram-1’ produces a peak vacuum thrust of 100 kN (or ~10 Tons) and has a burn time of 108 sec. The rocket stage has been built with high-strength carbon fiber structure, solid fuel, novel thermal protection system, and carbon ablative nozzle. This testing will help Skyroot in development of orbital vehicle Vikram-1 and gives great confidence for the other rocket stages planned to be tested soon. This is largest rocket stage ever designed, manufactured, and tested completely in the private sector. There was a good match of test results with the design predictions in the very first attempt, which is a testimony to the team's capabilities. The state-of-the-art technology like carbon composite case, high propellant volumetric loading up to 94%, lighter EPDM based thermal protection system, and submerged nozzle have been validated through the successful static test. The video of the firing

Cryogenic rocket engine

Dhawan-1 
On 25 September 2020, Skyroot Aerospace unveiled the Dhawan-1 (named after Satish Dhawan) upper stage cryogenic engine that will power heavier-lift systems such as Vikram-II. This is the first cryogenic engine in India that will use liquefied natural gas (LNG) as fuel; this fuel has the advantages of being clean, renewable and suited for long duration space missions. Dhawan-1 is 3D printed and designed with a regenerative cooling configuration.

Skyroot successfully test fired India's first privately developed small cryogenic engine called Dhawan-1 running on liquefied natural gas (LNG) and liquid oxygen (LOX) on 25 November 2021. It was a technology demonstration experiment for the upper stage of Vikram-2 rocket that is under active development. Solar Industries provided the test site. The engine made by 3D printing process and using super alloys.

Launch vehicles

Skyroot Aerospace has been working on its Vikram series of expendable small lift launchers. Rockets are designed for very quick assemblies. They also have plans to develop a fully reusable vehicle.

On November 18th, Skyroot Aerospace successfully completed the first launch of a private developed rocket from Indian soil.

Skyroot Rockets model

See also 
 
 Space industry of India
 Indian Space Research Organisation
 New Space India Limited
 Pixxel
 Satellize
 List of private spaceflight companies
 Bellatrix Aerospace
 Vikram 1
 Agnibaan

References

External links

Aerospace companies
Rockets and missiles
Indian private spaceflight companies
Private spaceflight companies
Rocket engine manufacturers of India
Commercial launch service providers
Spacecraft manufacturers
Indian companies established in 2018
Manufacturing companies based in Hyderabad, India
Indian brands
Space programme of India
2018 establishments in Telangana